Iniyum Kaanaam is a 1979 Indian Malayalam-language film,  directed by Charles Ayyampally and produced by S. S. R. Thambidurai. The film stars Prem Nazir, Thikkurissy Sukumaran Nair, Kottayam Santha and Alummoodan. The film has musical score by M. S. Viswanathan.

Cast
Prem Nazir as Ramadas
Vincent as Devan/Madanlal
Ushakumari as Nirmala
Vijayalalitha as Rita
Vijaya
Thikkurissy Sukumaran Nair as Ramdas's father
Alummoodan as Kesavan
Meena as Janakiamma
Kottayam Santha as Parvathyamma
Stanley
Thodupuzha Radhakrishnan

Soundtrack
The music was composed by M. S. Viswanathan and the lyrics were written by Chirayinkeezhu Ramakrishnan Nair.

References

External links
 

1979 films
1970s Malayalam-language films
Films scored by M. S. Viswanathan